The Stomach for It is the third studio album by American post-hardcore band The Bunny the Bear, released through Victory Records on May 22, 2012. The album peaked at number 21 on the Billboard Top Heatseekers chart.

The album was announced in March 2012, and a dual single was released to promote the album's release, containing the tracks "Lonely" and "Soul". The release is the last by the band with a full band lineup; the band worked with studio musicians Doug White (the album's producer) and Matt McGinley for their following three releases.

Track listing

Chart performance

Personnel
Credits were adapted from AllMusic.

The Bunny the Bear
Chris "The Bear" Hutka - clean vocals
Matthew "The Bunny" Tybor - unclean vocals, songwriting, lyrics, producing
Cody Morse - guitar
Steve Drachenburg - bass
Matt Trozzi - Drums

Additional personnel
Doug White - producing, engineering, mixing
Alan Douches - mastering
Don Duquette - programming
Jake Andrews - guitar engineering

References

2012 albums
The Bunny the Bear albums
Victory Records albums